Captain Albert James Prince-Cox (8 August 189026 October 1967) was an English football manager, player and referee, boxer, boxing promoter and a fellow of the Royal Meteorological Society.

Prince-Cox became the Secretary-manager of Bristol Rovers in 1930. At the time of his appointment the club were struggling financially, but he was credited with turning the situation around through his use of the player transfer market to buy and sell players for a profit. He left The Pirates (a nickname that he introduced, along with the team's blue and white quartered shirts, which are still worn today) in 1936. He then spent two years working as a full-time boxing promoter, before being appointed as manager of Gloucester City in 1938, at which point he was one of the best-known sporting figures in the West of England.

He died in late 1967, aged 77, in Bristol.

References

External links
 
 
 

1890 births
1967 deaths
Date of death missing
English footballers
English football referees
Gloucester City A.F.C. players
Gloucester City A.F.C. managers
English football managers
English male boxers
People from Southsea
Bristol Rovers F.C. managers
English meteorologists
British boxing promoters
Association footballers not categorized by position
20th-century British businesspeople